The 1992 Swedish Golf Tour was the ninth season of the Swedish Golf Tour, a series of professional golf tournaments held in Sweden and Finland.

All the tournaments also featured on the 1992 Challenge Tour.

Schedule
The season consisted of 9 events played between May and September.

Order of Merit

References

Swedish Golf Tour